Dennis Harris is an American session guitarist, songwriter and arranger. Historically he played a significant part in the Philly Sound, playing on many of the hits during the 1970s. The hits include, "Only the Strong Survive" by Billy Paul, "Ain't No Stoppin' Us Now" by McFadden & Whitehead and "Lady Love" by Lou Rawls. He also played the guitar intro on Rawls' hit "You'll Never Find Another Love like Mine". He is a former member of The Philly Groove Orchestra, The Trammps, MFSB and The Salsoul Orchestra. In recent years he has been part of the New MFSB. He is also a guitar teacher.

Background
Harris joined former Volcanos members which included Jimmy Ellis and became a member of The Trammps which also included Ron Kersey on keyboards, John Hart on organ, Stanley Wade on bass and Michael Thompson on drums. He was the original lead guitarist for the group.

His guitar can be heard on the song "Ain't No Stoppin' Us Now" by McFadden & Whitehead which was a hit in 1979. Along with Bobby Eli, Tommy Bell, Jimmy Williams, and Earl Young, Harris' importance was acknowledged.

With a master's degree in business, Harris has had two concurrent careers, music and banking. He is also a 2016 Musicians Hall of Fame inductee.

Career
Dennis Harris's career really took off in the 1970s when he was playing guitar for the Delfonics. In 1975 he was taken into the studio by the lead singer and he became part of the scene.

He wrote and handled the arrangement and was co-producer for the song "Redwood Beach" which was the B side for MFSB's 1977 single, "Use ta Be My Guy". Another release that year was the Killer Joe album by Benny Golson. Harris played on five of the album's tracks and co-composed the track "Love Uprising".
He co-produced the MFSB 1978 album, MFSB: The Gamble & Huff Orchestra which was released in 1978. His guitar line opens up the "There's No Other Like You" which was the B side for Melba Moore's hit "You Stepped Into My Life". He arranged the song "That's Not Part of the Show" which appeared on the 1979 Love Talk album by The Manhattans which got to #20 on the soul chart, and #141 on the pop chart.
He played on Leon Huff's solo album, Here to Create Music which was released in 1980.

In February, 2019, he was interviewed on the  Doris Hall-James Indie Show. He talked about MFSB as well as his playing the intro on Lou Rawls' hit "You'll Never Find Another Love like Mine". He and In June, he again he was interviewed on The Doris Hall-James Indie Show. He and fellow musician, Jimmy Williams and they talked about his cousin Norman Harris.

In  July, 2019, he played at the Philly Beats event which was facilitated by Philadelphia Clef Club of Jazz & Performing Arts.

Discography

References

Links
 AllMusic, Credits, Dennis Harris
 Discogs, Dennis Harris
 jaxta | Official Music Credits - Dennis Harris
 Metason, ArtistInfo, Dennis Harris

Interviews
 The Doris Hall-James Indie Show, February 2, 2019 Musical Journey's of Dennis HarrisNote: Sound doesn't come on until 2:10
 The Doris Hall-James Indie Show, Jun 18, 2019

American male guitarists
African-American guitarists
MFSB members
The Trammps members
Salsoul Orchestra members
Year of birth missing (living people)
Living people